2018–19 Premier Badminton League (also known as Vodafone PBL for sponsorship reasons) was the fourth edition of Premier Badminton League. It was played from 22 December 2018 to 13 January 2019. The season featured a new team – Pune 7 Aces – bringing the total to nine competing teams. Also, the Bengaluru team previously known as Bengaluru Blasters featured as Bengaluru Raptors.

Bengaluru Raptors beat Mumbai Rockets by 4 - 3 in the final tie to lift their maiden title.

Squads

Points table

 Qualified for knockouts
Five matches (MP) constitute one tie
Each team will play six ties
1 point for each Regular Match Won (RMW) 
0 points for Regular Matches Lost (RML)
2 points for each Trump Match Won (TMW) 
-1 point for each Trump Match Lost (TML)
Source: Official PBL website

Fixtures

League Stage

Knockout stage

References

Premier Badminton League
Premier Badminton League
Premier Badminton League
Premier Badminton League
Badminton tournaments in India
Premier Badminton League